Adam Drummond may refer to:
Adam Drummond (politician) (1713–1786), Scottish merchant, banker and member of parliament
Adam Drummond (surgeon) (1679–1758), Scottish surgeon-apothecary
Adam Drummond, 17th Baron Strange (born 1928), English peer